Skjaldbreiður ("broad shield") is an Icelandic lava shield formed in one huge and protracted eruption roughly 9,500 years ago. The extensive lava fields which were produced by this eruption, flowed southwards, and formed the basin of Þingvallavatn, Iceland's largest lake, and Þingvellir, the "Parliament Plains" where the Icelandic national assembly, the Alþing was founded in 930.

The volcano summit is at 1,060 metres, and its crater measures roughly 300 metres in diameter.

Straddling the Mid-Atlantic ridge, the lava fields from Skjaldbreiður have been torn and twisted over the millennia, forming a multitude of fissures and rifts inside the Þingvellir National Park, the best known of which are Silfra, Almannagjá , Hrafnagjá  and Flosagjá .

Gallery

References

 
 

Mountains of Iceland
Shield volcanoes of Iceland
Dormant volcanoes
West Volcanic Zone of Iceland
Lava fields
Þingvellir
One-thousanders of Iceland